The men's hammer throw competition at the 1968 Summer Olympics in Mexico City, Mexico took place on October 16–17. There were 22 competitors from 12 nations. The maximum number of athletes per nation had been set at 3 since the 1930 Olympic Congress. The event was won by Gyula Zsivótzky of Hungary, who had taken silver in both 1960 and 1964; he was the third man to win three medals in the hammer throw (after John Flanagan and Matt McGrath. Zsivótzky defeated defending champion Romuald Klim of the Soviet Union, who earned silver this time to become the sixth man to win multiple medals in the event. Bronze went to Lázár Lovász of Hungary.

Background

This was the 15th appearance of the event, which has been held at every Summer Olympics except 1896. Eight of the 15 finalists from the 1964 Games returned: gold medalist Romuald Klim of the Soviet Union, two-time silver medalist Gyula Zsivótzky of Hungary, bronze medalist Uwe Beyer of the United Team of Germany (now competing for West Germany), sixth-place finisher (and 1956 gold medalist and 1960 finalist) Hal Connolly of the United States, seventh-place finisher Ed Burke of the United States, eleventh-place finisher Sándor Eckschmiedt of Hungary, twelfth-place finisher (and 1956 and 1960 finalist) Albert Hall of the United States, and thirteenth-place finisher Takeo Sugawara of Japan. Klim and Zsivótzky had been favored in 1964; they were favored again in 1968. Zsivótzky had the best throw of the pair, a world record 73.76 metres, but Klim had won nine straight head-to-head matchups between the two.

El Salvador and Nicaragua each made their debut in the event; East and West Germany both competed separately for the first time. The United States appeared for the 15th time, the only nation to have competed at each appearance of the event to that point.

Competition format

The competition consisted of two rounds, qualification and final. Each athlete received three throws in the qualifying round. All who achieved the qualifying distance of 66.00 metres progressed to the final. If fewer than twelve athletes achieved this mark, then the twelve furthest throwing athletes would reach the final. Each finalist was allowed three throws in last round, with the top eight athletes after that point being given three further attempts.

Records

Prior to the competition, the existing world and Olympic records were as follows.

For the second straight Games, Gyula Zsivótzky led the qualifying round with an Olympic record throw, this time of 72.60 metres. In the final, Romuald Klim beat that record with a fourth throw of 73.28 metres to take the lead. Zsivótzky was able to answer on the fifth throw with 73.36 metres to finish with the gold medal and a new Olympic record. Lázár Lovász and Takeo Sugawara each threw 69.78 metres in the final to make four men in total surpassing the old record (but after Zsivótzky's better throw in the qualifying round, so neither ever held the record).

Schedule

All times are Central Standard Time (UTC-6)

Results

Qualifying

Qual. rule: qualification standard 66.00m (Q) or at least best 12 qualified (q). Hall and Connolly, both finalists in each of the last three Games, each missed the qualifying mark.

Final

The tie between Lovász and Sugawara was broken by their second-best throws.

References

External links
 Official Olympic Report, la84foundation.org. Retrieved August 14, 2012.

Athletics at the 1968 Summer Olympics
Hammer throw at the Olympics
Men's events at the 1968 Summer Olympics